The Greene Street Historic District is a national historic district in Cumberland, Allegany County, Maryland.  It is a  linear historic district along both sides of Greene Street on the west side of Cumberland. It contains 45 buildings (44 are  brick), 37 of which are residential and 8 of which exhibit commercial design characteristics. The earliest buildings in the district are built in the Federal style, followed by buildings erected in the Greek Revival, Italianate, Queen Anne, and Colonial Revival styles. The earliest of the district's resources was constructed about 1820, with the most recent built about 1930.

It was listed on the National Register of Historic Places in 2005.

References

External links
, including photo in 2000, at Maryland Historical Trust
Boundary Map of the Greene Street Historic District, Allegany County, at Maryland Historical Trust

Historic districts on the National Register of Historic Places in Maryland
Historic districts in Allegany County, Maryland
Cumberland, Maryland
National Register of Historic Places in Allegany County, Maryland